Esther Woolfson is a British writer. She is known for her books on birds. She grew up in Glasgow. She studied Chinese at Edinburgh University and Hebrew University.

Works
Between Light and Storm: How We Live With Other Species (Granta, 2020)
Corvus: A Life with Birds (Granta, 2008)
Field Notes from a Hidden City: An Urban Nature Diary (Granta, 2013)

References

External links
Official website

Living people
21st-century British non-fiction writers
21st-century British women writers
British women non-fiction writers
Alumni of the University of Edinburgh
Hebrew University of Jerusalem alumni
British ornithological writers
Writers from Glasgow
Year of birth missing (living people)
Place of birth missing (living people)
Scottish Jews